Halimabad may refer to:
 Halimabad, Markazi
 Halimabad, North Khorasan